Krestina Zhukova (born 9 November 1990) is a Paralympic athlete from Russia who competes in T20 classification track and field events. She won gold for Poland at the 2012 Summer Paralympics in the Long Jump class F20. Zhukova competed for her country at the 2012 Summer Paralympics in London, where she finished second to claim silver.

References 

Paralympic athletes of Russia
Athletes (track and field) at the 2012 Summer Paralympics
Paralympic silver medalists for Russia
1990 births
Living people
Medalists at the 2012 Summer Paralympics
People from Shakhunya
Russian female long jumpers
Paralympic medalists in athletics (track and field)
Sportspeople from Nizhny Novgorod Oblast
21st-century Russian women